Ten Thousand Light-Years from Home is a short story collection by Alice Sheldon under the pen name of James Tiptree, Jr. that was first published in 1973. This was the first book Sheldon published.

Contents
 Introduction by Harry Harrison
 "And I Awoke and Found Me Here on the Cold Hill's Side"
 "The Snows Are Melted, The Snows Are Gone"
 "The Peacefulness of Vivyan"
 "Mamma Come Home" ( "The Mother Ship")
 "Help" (a.k.a. "Pupa Knows Best")
 "Painwise"
 "Faithful to Thee, Terra, in Our Fashion" (a.k.a. "Parimutuel Planet")
 "The Man Doors Said Hello To"
 "The Man Who Walked Home"
 "Forever to a Hudson Bay Blanket"
 "I'll Be Waiting for You When the Swimming Pool Is Empty"
 "I'm Too Big But I Love to Play"
 "Birth of a Salesman"
 "Mother in the Sky with Diamonds"
 "Beam Us Home"

External links
 The book at fantasticfiction.co.uk
 

Short story collections by James Tiptree Jr.
1973 short story collections
Ace Books books